Wrabness is a small village and civil parish near Manningtree, Essex, England. The village is located six miles (10 km) west of Harwich. Wrabness railway station is served by trains on the Mayflower Line.  Wrabness had a population of approximately 400.

All Saints' Church

The oldest building in the village is All Saints' Church, which dates from around 1100.  The church's bell tower collapsed in the seventeenth century, and the bell moved temporarily to a wooden bell cage in the church yard.  The bell cage remains to this day.

The Mine Depot
The largest enterprise and main employer at Wrabness was for many years (including the world wars) the Royal Navy Mine Depot, where thousands of mines were stored for laying in the North Sea. Men from the Depot won medals for defusing enemy mines and handling dangerous ammunition for the Navy at nearby Parkeston Quay. The site is today in civilian use.

Wrabness Nature Reserve
Wrabness Local Nature Reserve was designated in 1993. The site was once a former mine depot established in 1921 by the Ministry of Defence. It was closed in 1963. Following closure, a number of planning applications were put forward (including an application for a prison in 1968 and 1989). The site was saved from closure when it was bought by Wrabness Nature Reserve Charitable Trust in 1992. The site has now been taken over by the Essex Wildlife Trust.

The reserve is an important wildlife site - owls, yellowhammers, whitethroats, turtle dove, song thrush, nightingales and bullfinches can be seen.  There are also many wild plants such as corn mint, hairy buttercup, sea aster and ox-eye daisy.

There is good access with a hard-core path around the reserve making it accessible for pushchairs or with disabilities.

Grayson Perry's "Julie’s House"

In 2015 a conceptual holiday home was created by the artist Grayson Perry, working with FAT, and commissioned by the charity Living Architecture. It is known as "Julie’s House" or "A House for Essex", in homage to the "single mums in Dagenham, hairdressers in Colchester, and the landscape and history of Essex". The house is highly decorated incorporating rooftop ornaments, and overlooks the River Stour near the village.

References

External links

Wrabness Village Website
RSPB Stour Estuary
All Saints Church website

Villages in Essex
Civil parishes in Essex
Tendring
Local Nature Reserves in Essex